"Dear My Friend" is a song by the Japanese J-pop group Every Little Thing, released as their third single on January 22, 1997.

Track listing
 Dear My Friend — 3:48 (Words & music - Mitsuru Igarashi)
 Dear My Friend (U.K. mix) — 7:21
 Dear My Friend (instrumental) — 3:47

Chart positions

External links
 Dear My Friend information at Avex Network.
 Dear My Friend information at Oricon.
 Dear My Friend information at Mora.jp (song length)

1997 singles
Every Little Thing (band) songs
Songs written by Mitsuru Igarashi
1997 songs
Avex Trax singles